The pursuit of Nazi collaborators refers to the post-World War II pursuit and apprehension of individuals who were not citizens of the Third Reich at the outbreak of World War II but collaborated with the Nazi regime during the war. Hence, this article does not cover former members of the NSDAP and their fates after the war.

Background 
There were a number of motives for the apprehension of suspected collaborators.  The main motives were: revenge for those murdered, especially those murdered on ethnic grounds in the Holocaust (principally among Jews, Poles, and Russians); a desire after the war to see those responsible face justice, and be categorised as criminals by a court of law (See Nuremberg Trials); a means of ensuring that criminal acts done were brought to light and placed on the official record, with evidence, so that they could never be disproven (some of the acts being so unthinkable that denial was plausible); widespread sense that genocide of whole communities and cultures on such a scale was intolerable and must not be left unprosecuted even despite the inadequacy of existing laws; and fear that a "Nazi underground" of some kind existed, such as the mythical ODESSA, which could allow the enemy to somehow regroup for their proclaimed Fourth Reich.

Means of pursuit 
The pursuit took many forms, both individual and organised. Several organisations and individuals (famous Nazi hunters) pursued ex-Nazis or Nazi collaborators who allegedly engaged in war crimes or crimes against humanity. Individuals reported seeing someone they recognised, now living under a false identity. Specific individuals were named and sought by groups or governments for their crimes during the war.

Others were subject to after-war spontaneous retaliation in occupied countries, which in some areas led to "witch hunts" for those suspected of having been collaborators, in which vigilantism and summary justice were common. After a first period of spontaneous pursuit, provisional governments took the matter into their own hands and brought suspected criminals to court. The Nuremberg Trial in Germany judged only the highest German Nazi authorities, and each country prosecuted and sentenced their own collaborationists. Pierre Laval in France was judged and sentenced to death, while Philippe Pétain was also sentenced to death, but Charles de Gaulle later commuted that to a life sentence. Governments investigated and interrogated people suspected of collaboration, for example the U.S. DOJ Office of Special Investigations.

Nazi support and escape organisations were infiltrated; the most famous was the ODESSA network, its various "ratlines" and those believed to have aided and abetted them. However, many suspected war criminals were also given amnesty, and some reached high positions in post-war administrations (e.g. Maurice Papon, who became Police Prefect of Paris in charge during the Algerian War (1954–62); he was blamed for the 1961 Paris massacre). Others were never even tried, such as Robert de Foy who resumed his position as head of the Belgian State Security Service 1945–1958.

Pursuit in specific countries

Argentina 

In 1960 Adolf Eichmann was captured by Mossad agents in Argentina and smuggled into Israel. Eichmann provided a location in Argentina where Josef Mengele had been but Mossad was unable to find him; by 1961 Mengele had moved to Brazil. In early October 1999, Nazi hunter Efraim Zuroff tracked Ustasha Dinko Šakić, the former commandant of Jasenovac concentration camp (nicknamed the "Auschwitz of the Balkans"). Šakić had lived in Argentina for more than 50 years. He was extradited to Croatia and sentenced by a Zagreb court to 20 years' imprisonment for his crimes.

Australia 
Latvia applied to Australia to extradite Konrāds Kalējs, allegedly a senior officer in the pro-Nazi Arajs Commando, but he died on 8 November 2001 before he could be extradited. Kalējs migrated to Australia in 1950 and took citizenship. Hungary applied for the extradition of Charles Zentai from Australia. He was accused of the murder of Peter Balazs, an 18-year-old Jewish man, in Budapest in November 1944, while serving in the Hungarian Army.

Belgium 
Belgium imprisoned Belgian nationals who had collaborated with the Nazis and executed some. One Belgian to be sentenced to execution was Pierre Daye, however he was one of the first Nazi collaborators to escape Europe, and unusually by plane. He fled to Argentina with the help of Charles Lescat, also collaborator of Je suis partout. Once in Argentina he attended a meeting organised by Juan Perón in the Casa Rosada during which a network (colloquially called ratlines) was created, to organise the escape of collaborators and former Nazis. On 17 June 1947, Belgium requested his extradition from Argentina, however the Argentine Government ignored this request. Now secure in his freedom, Pierre Daye resumed his writing activities, becoming the editor of an official Perónist review.

Henri de Man was one of the leading Belgian socialist theoreticians of his period, who collaborated with Nazi Germany during World War II. After the liberation of Belgium, he crossed the border to Switzerland. He was convicted in absentia of treason after the war. He died 20 June 1953, together with his wife, in a collision with a train in Murten, Switzerland.

Albert Luykx fled to the Republic of Ireland in 1948 and became an Irish citizen in 1954.

Czechoslovakia 
Actions against Nazi collaborators in Czechoslovakia, real or alleged, had two significant forms, by judiciary or by mob action. Immediately after the liberation of Czechoslovakia by Soviet and American armies, in an atmosphere of chaos, wild chases began. Individual acts of revenge, mob violence, and simply criminal acts motivated by the possibility to rob or loot targets, occurred. In some places were conducted, by organised groups of self-styled partisans, violence which resembled what is today known as ethnic cleansing. In most places this stopped when the provisional Czech government and local authorities took power. Other forms included legal action, undertaken by the state administration, after the war, until the regular Czech parliament was established. President Beneš ruled by issuing decrees, which were later ratified by parliament.

By decree 5/1945, property of untrustworthy persons was put under national administration. Untrustworthy were considered German and Hungarian nationals, and people who were active in destruction of the Czechoslovak state and its democratic government, supported Nazi occupation by any means, or were members of organisations considered fascist or collaborator. By the same decree, property of people of German and Hungarian nationality, who could prove they were anti-Nazi, could be returned to them.

By decree 12/1945 Sb., farm property of German and Hungarian nationals or citizens was confiscated, unless they could prove active resistance against Nazism. Property of traitors, and enemies of the republic was confiscated, regardless of nationality or citizenship. By decree 16/1945 Sb., special tribunals were started. These people's courts had right to sentence to long term imprisonment, life sentence or death. Prosecutions varied from verbal support to those who had committed crimes against humanity, no prosecution was based on ethnicity. By 33/1945 Sb. people of German and Hungarian nationality or ethnicity lost their Czechoslovakian citizenship. However, they had right to apply for renewal.

Most problematic was the law 115/1946, concerning resistance to the Nazi regime, which shifted limit of immunity to the year 1946, effectively amnestying all crimes, acts of individual revenge and atrocities against Germans and Hungarians long after the war.

People who lost Czechoslovakian citizenship and failed to apply or did not get it were transferred to Germany, many through the transfer camp established at Terezín, near the Theresienstadt concentration camp.

Estonia 
In the Estonian war crimes trials of 1961 and 1962, several collaborators were sentenced for participation in the Estonian holocaust. Many of the accused escaped punishment by escaping into exile or by suicide. The infamous Karl Linnas, who had been sentenced to death in absentia was finally deported by the United States in 1987, and died in a prison hospital shortly after.

France 

After the liberation, France was briefly swept by a wave of executions of suspected collaborators. At least some of the women suspected of having romantic liaisons with Germans were publicly humiliated by having their heads shaved. Those who had engaged in the black market were also stigmatised as "war profiteers" (profiteurs de guerre). However, the Provisional Government of the French Republic (GPRF, 1944–46) quickly reestablished order and brought collaborators before the courts. Many of the convicted were later granted amnesty under the Fourth Republic (1946–1954), while some prominent civil servants, such as Maurice Papon, escaped prosecution altogether and succeeded in holding important positions even under Charles de Gaulle and the Fifth Republic (1958 and afterward).

Three periods have been identified:
The first phase (épuration sauvage) consisted of popular convictions, summary executions, and the shaving of women's heads. Estimates by police prefects made in 1948 and 1952 were that as many as six thousand executions occurred before the liberation of France, and four thousand thereafter. The second phase, épuration légale (legal purge), began on 26 and 27 June 1944 with Charles de Gaulle's ordinances on the judgment of collaborators by the commissions d'épuration; the commissions sentenced approximately 120,000 persons. Charles Maurras, the leader of the royalist Action française, was, for example, sentenced to life imprisonment on 25 January 1945. The third phase was more lenient towards collaborators; the trials of Philippe Pétain and the writer, Louis-Ferdinand Céline are examples of actions taken during this phase.

Between 1944 and 1951, official courts in France sentenced 6,763 people to death (3,910 in absentia) for treason and other offences, and 791 executions were actually carried out. More common was "national degradation," a loss of face and civil rights, which was meted out to 49,723 people.

Philippe Pétain, the former head of Vichy France, was charged with treason in July 1945. He was convicted and sentenced to death by firing squad, but Charles de Gaulle commuted the sentence to life imprisonment. Pierre Laval was however, executed after his trial. Most convicted people were given amnesty a few years later. In the police, collaborators often resumed official responsibilities. For example, Maurice Papon, who would be convicted in the 1990s for his role in the Vichy collaborationist government, was in the position of giving orders for the Paris massacre of 1961 as the head of the Parisian police.

The French members of the Waffen-SS Charlemagne Division who survived the war were regarded as traitors. Some of the more prominent officers were executed, while the rank-and-file were given prison terms; some of them were given the option of serving time in Indochina (1946–54) with the Foreign Legion instead of prison.

Many war criminals were judged only in the 1980s, including Paul Touvier, Klaus Barbie, Maurice Papon and his deputy Jean Leguay. The last two were both convicted for their roles in the July 1942 Rafle du Vel' d'Hiv, or Vel' d'Hiv Roundup. Famous Nazi hunters Serge and Beate Klarsfeld spent decades trying to bring them to justice. A fair number of collaborationists joined the OAS terrorist movement during the Algerian War (1954–62). Jacques de Bernonville escaped to Quebec, then Brazil. Jacques Ploncard d'Assac became a counselor of Salazar in Portugal.

Reliable statistics of the death toll do not exist. At the low end, one estimate is that approximately 10,500 were executed, before and after liberation. "The courts of Justice pronounced about 6,760 death sentences, 3,910 in absentia and 2,853 in the presence of the accused. Of these 2,853, 73 percent were commuted by de Gaulle, and 767 carried out. In addition, about 770 executions were ordered by the military tribunals. Thus the total number of people executed before and after the Liberation was approximately 10,500, including those killed in the épuration sauvage", notably including members and leaders of the milices. US forces put the number of "summary executions" following liberation at 80,000. The French Minister of the Interior at the time, March 1945, reported that the number executed was 105,000.

Greece 

Greece was under the control of the Third Reich from 1941 to 1944. After the liberation, the country followed a controversial period of denazification. Many collaborators and especially former leaders of the Nazi-held puppet regime in Athens were sentenced to death. General Georgios Tsolakoglou, the first collaborationist prime minister, was tried by the Greek Special Collaborators Court in 1945 and sentenced to death, but his penalty, like most death sentences, was commuted to life imprisonment. The second collaborationist leader, Konstantinos Logothetopoulos, who had fled to Germany after the Wehrmacht's withdrawal, was caught by the US military and was condemned to life imprisonment. In 1951, he was given parole and thus died outside prison. Ioannis Rallis, the third collaborationist prime minister, was tried on a treason charge; the court sentenced him to life imprisonment. However, several lower and middle figures that had collaborated with the Germans, especially members of the Security Battalions and the gendarmerie, were soon released and reinstated in their posts; in the developing Greek Civil War, their anti-Communist credentials were more important than their collaboration. Indeed, in many cases the same people who had collaborated with the Germans and staffed the post-war security establishment persecuted leftist former Resistance members.

Furthermore, during 1945, a Special Court on Collaborators in Ioannina condemned, in absentia, 1,930 Cham collaborators of the Axis to death (decision no. 344/1945). The next year the same court condemned an additional 179. However, the war crimes remained unpunished since the criminals had already fled abroad.

Israel 

Israel enacted the Nazis and Nazi Collaborators (Punishment) Law on 1 August 1950. Between 1950 and 1961, this law was used to prosecute around 40 Jewish Holocaust kapo murderers proven to have been Nazi collaborators. In 1960 Adolf Eichmann was captured by Mossad agents in Argentina and smuggled into Israel. On 15 December 1961, Eichmann was sentenced to death and then executed on 1 June 1962. In 1988 John Demjanjuk was sentenced to death too, but the guilty verdict was later overturned by the Supreme Court on 29 July 1993.

On 23 February 1965, Latvian aviator and Nazi collaborator Herberts Cukurs was assassinated by the Mossad, the Israeli foreign intelligence service, after being lured to Uruguay under the pretense of starting an aviation business.

Norway 

Vidkun Quisling, the war time Norwegian "Minister President", and, among others, Nasjonal Samling leaders Albert Viljam Hagelin and Ragnar Skancke, were convicted and executed by firing squad. A total of 45 people were sentenced to death and 37 were executed (25 Norwegians and 12 Germans). Both at the time and later these sentences were the subject of some debate, since the decision to reintroduce capital punishment to the Norwegian legal system for the post war trials was based on clauses in military law. Capital punishment in the Criminal Code had been abolished in 1904. The decision was made by the exiled Norwegian government in London in 1944, later to be debated three times in the Parliament during the trials, and to be confirmed by the Supreme Court. Another five Norwegian-Nazi collaborators were executed in Poland for crimes committed against Poles in Norway.

Poland 
In occupied Poland the status of Volksdeutsche had many privileges but one big disadvantage: Volksdeutsche were conscripted into the German Army. The Volksliste had 4 categories. No. 1 and No. 2 were considered ethnic Germans, while No. 3 and No. 4 were ethnic Poles that signed the Volksliste. No. 1 and No. 2 in the Polish areas re-annexed by Germany numbered ~1,000,000 and No. 3 and No. 4 ~1,700,000. In the General Government there were ~120,000 Volksdeutsche.

After the war, Volksdeutsche of Polish origins were treated by Poles with special contempt, and also considered traitors according to Polish law. German citizens that remained on territory of Poland became as a group personae non gratae. They had a choice of applying for Polish citizenship or being expelled to Germany. The property that belonged to Germans, German companies and German states, was confiscated by the Polish state along with many other properties in Communist Poland.

German owners, as explicitly stated by the law, were not eligible for any compensation. Those who decided to apply became subject to a verification process. At the beginning of the process, many acts of violence against Volksdeutsche took place. However, soon the verification of Volksdeutsche became controlled by the juridical process and was completed in a more controlled manner.

Soviet Union 

Russian and other Soviet members of the Russian Liberation Army and the Committee for the Liberation of the Peoples of Russia such as Andrey Vlasov were pursued, tried, and were either sent to Gulag prison camps or executed.

Many Soviet Prisoners of War were seen to have collaborated with the Nazis, even if they had done no more than been captured by the Wehrmacht, and spent the war in a camp. Many such unfortunate Soviet citizens were persecuted upon their repatriation to the Soviet Union. In general, after a short trial, if they were not executed, Nazi collaborators were imprisoned in Gulag forced labour camps.

The Volga German Autonomous Soviet Socialist Republic was abolished and Volga Germans were banished from their settlements on the Volga River with many being deported to Kazakhstan or Siberia.

United Kingdom 

At the end of the war a number of individuals were tried by the British government for high treason. These included members of the Waffen-SS British Free Corps and William Joyce, better known as Lord Haw-Haw. As agreed at the Yalta Conference, the British handed back many Soviet citizens to the Soviet authorities for trial. Some of these were collaborators who had served in the pro-Nazi Russian Liberation Army. A controversy would emerge several year later, because some of those handed over were White Russians and Cossacks who had never been Soviet citizens, and who were subsequently murdered by the Soviet authorities. Yugoslavs were handed over to Josip Broz Tito's forces, with many being imprisoned while some killed as a result.

Viktors Arājs, who was the leader of the eponymous commando unit which helped the Nazis murder the Jews of Latvia and Belarus, had been captured in the British zone of occupied Germany after the war, and was released in 1949 after spending several years in a prisoner-of-war camp, the British being ignorant to his true identity. He remained at large until 1979 when the West German government put him on trial. One of Arajs's deputies, Harijs Svikeris, settled in Britain after the war and in the 1990s was thought to be a strong candidate to be prosecuted under the War Crimes Act, but he died before being prosecuted.

In 1961 Ain-Ervin Mere was put on trial for leadership in the murder of 5,000 foreign Jews in Estonia, but his request for extradition by the British government, claiming that the Soviet government, who were conducted the trials, had insufficient evidence. On 1 April 1999, Anthony Sawoniuk was sentenced to life in prison after being found guilty of murdering 18 Jews in Britain's first Nazi war crimes trial. Sawoniuk had led "search-and-kill" police squads to hunt down Jews trying to escape after nearly 3,000 were massacred at Domachevo in Nazi-occupied Belarus during September 1942. He died in prison on 7 November 2005 at the age of 84.

Yugoslavia 
The reprisals for collaboration with the Nazis were particularly harsh in Yugoslavia, because collaborators were also on the losing side of a de facto civil war fought on the Yugoslav territory during World War II. The Communists executed many Ustashe, as well as their collaborators, particularly in the Bleiburg death marches.

After the war, the UDBA, Yugoslavia's secret police, was sent overseas to find and eliminate several former Ustashe who fled the country, including the leader of the Ustashe and their pro-Nazi government, Ante Pavelić. They conducted a successful assassination of Vjekoslav Luburić and others, and the extradition of Zdenko Blažeković, Andrija Artuković, and others.

See also 
 Collaboration with the Axis Powers during World War II
 Denazification
 Deschênes Commission
 Expulsion of Germans after World War II
 Jacob Luitjens
 List of SS personnel

References and notes

Bibliography 
 Martin Mauthner. Otto Abetz and His Paris Acolytes: French Writers Who Flirted with Fascism, 1930–1945. (Sussex Academic Press, 2016).

External links 
 BBC: UK Life for war criminal Anthony Sawoniuk

Aftermath of World War II

Political and cultural purges
Politics of World War II